Women's Tales is an ongoing short film anthology series created by fashion brand Miu Miu. Aside from the stipulation that the films use Miu Miu clothing the all female directors are given carte blanche to create their films. Miu Miu has commissioned two films a year since 2011, one for their summer collection and one for the winter collection.

Since 2012, all of the winter collection films have had their world premiere at the Venice Days section of the Venice International Film Festival. The summer collection films, which typically premiere during the New York Fashion Week in February, are shown there as well. Miu Miu is a so-called "creative partner," i.e. sponsor, of Venice Days.

History
The first film, Zoe Cassavetes' The Powder Room premiered online in late January 2011. The series' second installment, Lucrecia Martel's Muta, premiered at an invitation-only screening at a Beverly Hills mansion and online in July 2011.

In February 2012, the third film, Giada Colagrande's The Woman Dress, was screened during the New York Fashion Week and made available online. Massy Tadjedin's It's Getting Late, number four in the series, had its world premiere at the Venice Days sidebar of the 69th Venice International Film Festival where all four films from the series were screened together for the first time.

The fifth film, Ava DuVernay's The Door, premiered online in February 2013. The film was later shown at the 70th Venice International Film Festival along with Le donne della Vucciria by Palestinian actress and director Hiam Abbas.

In 2015, Agnès Varda's film Les 3 boutons premiered at the 72nd Venice International Film Festival.

In 2020 Miu Miu offered limited edition t-shirts printed with still from the films.

Films

References

External links
 Official Women's Tales website
 Women's Tales playlist on Miu Miu's YouTube channel

Short film series